The Gwynedd Archaeological Trust is an Archaeological Trust organisation established in 1974; it is one of four Welsh Archaeological Trusts.

The trust maintains Historic Environment Records for their area to provide archaeological advice to central government, planning authorities and other public bodies. The Gwynedd Archaeological Trust along with the other Welsh Archaeological Trusts were pioneers in developing Historic Environment Records (HERs). In the 1970s Wales was the first part of the UK to develop a fully national system of what were then called ‘Sites and Monuments Records’; this fully computerised system was pioneered by Don Benson who was then Chief Executive of the Dyfed Archaeological Trust. The Welsh Government is required to maintain HERs as a statutory obligation under the Historic Environment (Wales) Act 2016; these active databases are an essential component of the planning system in Wales.

Notable people 
 Andrew Davidson, Director of the Trust since 2011
 Nancy Edwards, Chair of the Trust 2004-2018
 A.H.A Hogg, Chair of the Trust 1982-1983
 David Longley, Director of the Trust 1992-2011

See also
Clwyd-Powys Archaeological Trust
Dyfed Archaeological Trust
Glamorgan-Gwent Archaeological Trust 
Cadw
Royal Commission on the Ancient and Historical Monuments of Wales

References

External links
Website of the Gwynedd Archaeological Trust

Archaeology of Wales
Archaeological organizations
Organisations based in Gwynedd